Luka Petričević (Cyrillic: Лука Петричевић; born 6 July 1992) is a Montenegrin footballer who most recently played for FK Lovćen.

Club career
Born in Podgorica, Petričević played with FK Budućnost Podgorica and OFK Beograd during his youth career. He joined PAOK FC in 2010 however he failed to make any league appearance, but instead, he played on loan with Agrotikos Asteras F.C. in the 2011–12 Greek Football League.

In 2012, he left PAOK and moved to Serbia by joining top league side FK Jagodina. He made his debut in the 2012–13 Serbian SuperLiga on 2 March 2013, in an away match against OFK Beograd which Jagodina won by 3–1.

After spending time on loan with Mogren, Petričević signed with third-tier US side Orange County Blues.

International career
Luka Petričević has been a member of the Montenegrin U-17 and U-19 national teams.

Honours
Jagodina
Serbian Cup: 2013
Orange County Blues
Western Conference (Regular Season) 2015
Mladost Podgorica
Montenegrin First League: 2016

References

1992 births
Living people
Footballers from Podgorica
Association football midfielders
Montenegrin footballers
Montenegro youth international footballers
PAOK FC players
Agrotikos Asteras F.C. players
FK Jagodina players
FK Mogren players
Orange County SC players
OFK Titograd players
FK Kom players
FK Lovćen players
Football League (Greece) players
Serbian SuperLiga players
Montenegrin First League players
USL Championship players
Montenegrin expatriate footballers
Expatriate footballers in Greece
Montenegrin expatriate sportspeople in Greece
Expatriate footballers in Serbia
Montenegrin expatriate sportspeople in Serbia
Expatriate soccer players in the United States
Montenegrin expatriate sportspeople in the United States